Tarpits and Canyonlands is North Carolina band Bombadil's second full-length album which was released on July 7, 2009. The band members when the record was released were James Phillips, Bryan Rahija, Daniel Michalak and Stuart Robinson. The album contains fifteen songs. It was re-released in 2014.

References

2009 albums
Bombadil (band) albums